The 1913 Ice Hockey European Championship was the fourth edition of the ice hockey tournament for European countries associated to the International Ice Hockey Federation .  
 
The tournament was played between January 25, and January 27, 1913, in München, Germany. With Belgium and Bohemia finishing equal on points, Belgium was declared champion based on goal difference.

Results

January 25

January 26

January 27

Final standings

Top Goalscorer
Maurice Deprez (Belgium), 7 goals

References

 Euro Championship 1913

 
1913
Ice Hockey European Championships
Ice Hockey European Championship
1910s in Munich
Sports competitions in Munich